This is a list of public art in Ceredigion, Wales. This list applies only to works of public art on permanent display in an outdoor public space and does not, for example, include artworks in museums.

Aberaeron

Aberbanc

Aberporth

Aberystwyth

Betws Bledrws

Borth

Cardigan

Cellan

Lampeter

Llangeitho

Llanbadarn Fawr

Llangrannog

Pen-llwyn

Tregaron

References

Ceredigion
Ceredigion